Good Movie is the third studio album by American rapper and producer Pi'erre Bourne. It was released through Interscope Records and Sosshouse on September 2, 2022. The album features guest appearances from Don Toliver and Young Nudy. The album was supported by one self-titled single, "Good Movie", which was released on August 26, 2022.

Critical reception

In a mixed review, Alphonse Pierre of Pitchfork wrote "This is a breakup album, or maybe an album about wanting to fall in love after a breakup. Before this record, his lyrics felt strung-together and goofy. But on Good Movie, there’s a point when he outdoes himself; some lines are astonishingly inane."

Track listing

References

2022 albums
Pi'erre Bourne albums
Interscope Records albums